Roberto de Abreu Filho (commonly known as "Cyborg" Abreu) is a Brazilian jiu-jitsu (BJJ) competitor, academy owner and instructor. A 7-time World No-Gi Champion, Abreu is known for his trademark Tornado Guard position which involves inverting underneath the opponent and elevating them into a sweep.

Career
Roberto de Abreu Filho grew up in rural Brazil and was affiliated with Nova Geracao. 
In 2000 Abreu was in a car accident and was left with 300 stitches on his left arm. He was told that he wouldn’t be able to move his arm again but four months later he won silver at the Brazilian Nationals. His coach told him that only  a cyborg could make a come back this fast. The name Cyborg then stuck with him.

Abreu is a very active BJJ competitor and coach, with multiple titles including gold medals at the 2010, 2011, 2012, 2017, 2019, and 2021 IBJJF No-Gi World Championships. He also won the ADCC Absolute title in 2013. Abreu currently living in Miami, United States where he runs his academy Fight Sports coaching multiple high level BJJ athletes.

Controversy
In 2020, a BJJ black belt under Abreu and instructor at Fight Sports Naples, Marcel Goncalves, was accused of sexual assault by a student of his who was 16 years old at the time. Initially, Abreu drew heavy criticism for his handling of the claims and how he chose to comment on them before he eventually put out a further statement that denounced Goncalves' actions. Since then, Abreu has also been named in a civil suit on the same matter, where he and the Fight Sports brand have been accused of "failure to properly oversee its trainers and instructors and its failures to properly care for vulnerable minors training at Fight Sports’ gyms.

On March 8, 2023 Cyborg was handed a three-year ban by the U.S. Anti-Doping Agency (USADA) after failing a December 20, 2022 drug test for using performance enhancing drugs at the 2022 IBJJF No-Gi World Championships. Abreu left the competition early and was tested off site. He tested positive for exogenous testosterone and metabolites  (steroids). His suspension began retroactively on January 25, 2023.

Brazilian Jiu Jitsu Achievements
Main Achievements (Black Belt):

 ADCC World Champion (2013)
 IBJJF No-Gi World Champion  (2021 / 2019 / 2017 / 2012 / 2011 / 2010)
 IBJJF Pan Championship (2008 / 2022)
 IBJJF European Open (2005)
 IBJJF Grand Prix (2019)
 IBJJF Masters World Championship (2018)
 Kasai Pro 264 lbs Grand Prix winner (2020)
 Grappling Pro Champion (2016)
 2nd Place ADCC World Championship (2009)
 2nd Place IBJJF World Championship (2010)
 2nd Place No-Gi World Champion (2021 / 2019 / 2008)
 2nd Place IBJJF Pan Championship (2009)
 2nd Place CBJJ Brazilian Nationals (2007)
 2nd Place AJP King of Mats (2018)
 3rd Place ADCC World Championship (2017/2013/2011)
 Brazilian Wrestling National Champion (Brazilian National team member).
 No Gi Grappler of the Year at the JitsMagazine BJJ Awards 2020
 2020 FloGrappling No-Gi Grappler of the Year

Main Achievements (Colored Belt):
 IBJJF Pan American Champion (2001 blue)
 2nd place World Jiu-Jitsu Championship (2004 brown)
 3rd place World Jiu-Jitsu Championship (2002 / 2003 purple)
 2nd place Pan American Championship (2002 purple)

Notes

See also
List of Brazilian Jiu-Jitsu practitioners

References

External links
 Interview with Roberto "Cyborg" Abreu
 Roberto "Cyborg" Abreu on BJJ Heroes
 Roberto "Cyborg" Abreu on FloGrappling
 A Martial Arts Star Is Criticized for His Handling of Abuse Cases (New York Times) 

Living people
Brazilian practitioners of Brazilian jiu-jitsu
1980 births
World No-Gi Brazilian Jiu-Jitsu Championship medalists
People from Campo Grande
Sportspeople from Mato Grosso do Sul